Oliver Edward O'Mara (March 8, 1891 in St. Louis, Missouri – October 24, 1989 in Reno, Nevada) was a shortstop in Major League Baseball from 1912 to 1919, primarily with the Brooklyn Robins. He had one at-bat in the 1916 World Series against the Boston Red Sox.

O'Mara threw out the first pitch for the Los Angeles Dodgers on opening day in 1981. At the time of his death, he was the oldest living professional baseball player. He is buried in Kenosha, Wisconsin.

References

External links

1891 births
1989 deaths
Major League Baseball shortstops
Detroit Tigers players
Brooklyn Robins players
Missoula (minor league baseball) players
Hannibal Cannibals players
Providence Grays (minor league) players
Evansville River Rats players
Fort Wayne Champs players
Atlanta Crackers players
Oakland Oaks (baseball) players
Binghamton Bingoes players
Indianapolis Indians players
Milwaukee Brewers (minor league) players
Baseball players from St. Louis
Burials in Wisconsin